The Guzerá or Guzerat is a Brazilian breed of domestic cattle. It derives from cross-breeding of Indian Kankrej cattle, imported to Brazil from 1870 onwards, with local taurine Crioulo cattle of European origin. The name is a Portuguese spelling of that of the western Indian state of Gujarat. 

The herd-book for the breed was started in 1938; in it, a dual-purpose (meat and dairy) line is distinguished from the beef type, and a polled variant is also distinguished. In 2010 there were approximately  head registered, constituting some 3.5% of the total number of indicine cattle in Brazil.

The Guzerá was one of the principal breeds from which the American Brahman developed in the twentieth century.

References 

Cattle breeds originating in Brazil
Cattle breeds